Sound by iLL is the first album released by Koji Nakamura under the moniker of iLL. Koji Nakamura is the former frontman of Japanese rock band Supercar.

Track listing

References

2006 albums